Samuli Suhonen (born 7 January 1980 in Kuopio) is a Finnish professional ice hockey defenceman who currently plays in Finland for KalPa of the SM-liiga.

References

External links

1980 births
Living people
People from Kuopio
Finnish ice hockey defencemen
KalPa players
Sportspeople from North Savo